Les Mées may refer to the following places in France:

 Les Mées, Alpes-de-Haute-Provence, a commune in the Alpes-de-Haute-Provence department
 Canton of Les Mées, defunct
 Les Mées, Sarthe, a commune in the Sarthe department